Private Worlds is a 1935 dramatic film which tells the story of the staff and patients at a mental hospital and the chief of the hospital, who has problems dealing with a female psychiatrist. The film stars Claudette Colbert, Charles Boyer, Joel McCrea, Joan Bennett, and Helen Vinson.

The movie was written by Phyllis Bottome, Gregory La Cava, and Lynn Starling and was directed by La Cava. Cinematographer Leon Shamroy used early zoom lenses to create special effects for the film.

Claudette Colbert was nominated for the Academy Award for Best Actress for the film.

The film is based on the 1934 novel of the same title by British writer Phyllis Bottome, who has had several of her works transferred to film, such as The Mortal Storm (MGM, 1940).

Plot
The film tells of problems in the lives of doctors and patients. A female doctor (Colbert) probes the twisted minds of her patients in a mental institution. The very caring psychiatrist and her colleague face discrimination by a conservative new supervisor.

Cast 
Claudette Colbert as Dr. Jane Everest 
Charles Boyer as Dr. Charles Monet 
Joan Bennett as Sally MacGregor 
Helen Vinson as Claire Monet 
Joel McCrea as Dr. Alex MacGregor 
Jean Rouverol as Carrie Flint 
Esther Dale as Matron 
Guinn 'Big Boy' Williams as Jerry 
Dora Clement as Bertha Hirst 
Sam Godfrey as Tom Hirst 
Samuel S. Hinds as Dr. Arnold 
Theodore von Eltz as Dr. Harding 
Stanley Andrews as Dr. Barnes

Reception
The film had a loss of $10,458.

References

External links 
 
 
 

1935 films
American black-and-white films
Paramount Pictures films
Films directed by Gregory La Cava
Films about psychiatry
1935 drama films
Films produced by Walter Wanger
American drama films
Films based on British novels
1930s American films